Finding Nemo is a 2003 action-adventure video game based on the film of the same name by Disney and Pixar. The GameCube, PlayStation 2 and Xbox versions were developed by Traveller's Tales, whilst the Game Boy Advance version of the game was developed by Vicarious Visions, and its Microsoft Windows and Mac versions were developed by KnowWonder. All versions were published by THQ.

Gameplay
The goal is to complete different levels under the roles of film protagonists Nemo, Marlin or Dory. It includes cutscenes from the movie, and each clip is based on a level, e.g. hopping through a batch of jellyfish.

The Game Boy Advance version of Finding Nemo mostly consists of side-scrolling adventure/puzzle stages, along with several minigames interspaced across its length. Each level and minigame is based on a specific scene from the film. The game does not support saving in its Game Boy Advance version, instead opting for a password system to maintain progress.

Plot
Nemo the clownfish is excited for his first day of school, and his protective father Marlin accompanies him. While on a field trip, Nemo spots a speedboat in the distance and decides to swim up to it. He is captured by a diver and taken on board the speedboat, which then departs. Marlin chases after the speedboat, but soon loses it. After noticing a diver's mask fall into the water, Marlin chases it down, but is unsuccessful in retrieving it.

Marlin meets Dory, a blue tang who suffers from short-term memory loss. She tries to help lead Marlin to the boat, but soon forgets what they are doing. They meet a shark named Bruce, who is fish-friendly. Bruce invites them to a party inside a sunken submarine, although Marlin is sceptical of Bruce. In the submarine, Marlin finds the mask that he tried to catch earlier. Dory gets a nosebleed after an argument with Marlin, and Bruce becomes violent after smelling the blood. He tries to eat Marlin and Dory, forcing them to flee the submarine.

Meanwhile, Nemo is placed in a fish tank in a dentist's office, and he quickly befriends the other fish in the tank. In the ocean, Dory reads an address on the mask, which points her and Marlin to the city of Sydney. Upon arriving there, the two fish meet Nigel, a pelican who agrees to take them to the dentist's office. While they are en route, the dentist puts Nemo in a bag to give to his niece. Marlin, Dory, and Nigel arrive at the office, but must depart as Nigel is forced out by the dentist. Gill, a fish in the tank, helps Nemo escape via the dentist's sink.

Nemo travels his way through the sewers and into the ocean, where he manages to find Marlin and Dory. Shortly after, a fishing net catches Dory and several other fish and tries to pull them out of the water. Nemo comes up with an idea to get all the fish to swim down. This successfully breaks the net and frees them.

After their adventure, Marlin is not as protective of his son, knowing he can look after himself. Dory also spends a lot of time with the two, and she accompanies Marlin as he takes Nemo to school.

Reception

Finding Nemo received "mixed or average reviews" on all platforms according to the review aggregation website Metacritic. Famitsu gave it a score of 27 out of 40 for the PS2 version; and 26 out of 40 for the GameCube version.

Reviewing the Game Boy Advance version of the game, Gamespy called the game "a thing of beauty.", whilst bemoaning it as "pretty basic in the gameplay department", ultimately giving the game 2 stars out of 5.

Sales
In the United States alone, Finding Nemos Game Boy Advance version sold 1.2 million copies and earned $30 million by August 2006. During the period between January 2000 and August 2006, it was the 10th highest-selling game launched for the Game Boy Advance, Nintendo DS or PlayStation Portable in that country. The PlayStation 2 version received a "Platinum" sales award from the Entertainment and Leisure Software Publishers Association (ELSPA), indicating sales of at least 300,000 copies in the United Kingdom. 
As of November 2005, the game sold more than 5 million units worldwide.

References

External links
 
 
 

2003 video games
Action-adventure games
Disney video games
Video game
Game Boy Advance games
MacOS games
GameCube games
PlayStation 2 games
PlayStation Network games
THQ games
Traveller's Tales games
Video games based on films
Video games based on works by Andrew Stanton
Video games developed in the United Kingdom
Video games set in Australia
Video games with underwater settings
Windows games
Xbox games
Yuke's games
Vicarious Visions games
Single-player video games
Video games scored by Andy Blythe and Marten Joustra
Video games developed in the United States
Amaze Entertainment games